The Videle oil field is an oil field located in Videle, Teleorman County, Romania. It was discovered in 1958 and developed by Petrom. It began production in 1961 and produces oil.

References

Oil fields in Romania